The Kacey Musgraves Christmas Show is a 2019 musical Christmas television special directed by Chris Howe and produced for Amazon Prime Video. The special stars country music singer Kacey Musgraves as she prepares for a Christmas party, alongside an array of celebrity guests including Dan Levy, Troye Sivan, Fred Armisen, Kendall Jenner, Camila Cabello, Lana Del Rey, Leon Bridges, James Corden, Zooey Deschanel, and the Radio City Rockettes.

Synopsis
The "Wes Anderson-inspired reimagining of the holidays" features a mix of original songs featured on the 2016 album A Very Kacey Christmas, as well as new versions of holiday classics as duets with celebrity guests. Actor and writer Dan Levy  narrates Musgraves' holiday preparations, as she struggles to find her nana's Christmas tree star.

Reception
The special has a 67% positive rating on review aggregate site Rotten Tomatoes based on six reviews. Ellen Johnson of Paste called the special "campy holiday fun" and praised its musical performances, Musgraves' costumes, and its emotional resonance. Cat Zhang of Pitchfork had a more mixed reaction, criticizing its inconsistent tone and Musgraves' banter, but ultimately concluded that her "sincerity and magnetic calm" saved the special.

Soundtrack

The show's official soundtrack was released to digital retailers on the same day of the special's release through MCA Nashville.

References

2019 television specials
2010s American television specials
Christmas television specials
Kacey Musgraves
Musical television specials
Amazon Prime Video original programming